Capricho Awards de Gato Nacional is an award given annually since 2001 by the magazine Capricho, with open voting by the official Editora Abril site. The singer Taylor Swift, along with actor Bruno Gagliasso holds the record for most awards a total of 3.

In 2014 the category was called "drops", containing American and Brazilian artists, as indicated.

Winners and indicated

More Award

List of winners 
 2002: Henri Castelli
 2006/2001: Reynaldo Gianecchini
 2008: Di Ferrero
 2009: Rodrigo Hilbert
 2010/2013: Caio Castro
 2011: Chay Suede
 2012: Arthur Aguiar
 2014: Ian Somerhalder

References 

Magazine awards
Brazilian awards
Awards established in 2001